Olav Midttun (8 April 1883 – 5 January 1972) was a Norwegian philologist, biographer, magazine editor, and the first national program director of the Norwegian Broadcasting Corporation (NRK).

He was born in Mauranger as a son of teacher Jørgen Midttun (1855–1938) and Marta Øvrehus (1847–1920). He was a brother of Gisle Midttun. He was married twice, first from October 1909 to Mietze Bentsen, née Sandkuhl (1877–1942), then from 1950 to Borghild Skarmann.

He edited the cultural magazine Syn og Segn for more than fifty years, from 1908 to 1960. He was program manager of NRK from its start in 1933. He was fired in 1940 by the Nazi regime during the occupation of Norway by Nazi Germany, and returned after the Second World War as program manager from 1945 to 1947. He was later a professor at the University of Oslo, and wrote several biographies. He was also a member of Bærum municipal council.

References

1883 births
1972 deaths
People from Kvinnherad
Norwegian philologists
Academic staff of the University of Oslo
Norwegian magazine editors
Norwegian biographers
Norwegian male writers
Male biographers
NRK people
Bærum politicians
Liberal Party (Norway) politicians
20th-century philologists